Usance refers to the utilization of economic goods to satisfy needs. In manufacturing, "usance" means "inputs." It is used in "usance bills." This terminology is used in banks in India, when dealing with forex.

In medieval banking, "usance" denoted the period of time, set by custom, before a bill of exchange could be redeemed at its destination.

In today's financial world, the term usance denotes the period of time between the date of the bill and the payment of the bill, which is allowed by law. Usance differs from country to country. Some countries may have a usance period of as little as 2 weeks, while some others may have a usance period of up to 2 months. Usance usually applies to items or goods purchased on credit.

Usance may also mean the interest that will be charged on the person who has borrowed some amount of money. Thus, usance here means the profits earned from the lending of principal.

Usance as a bill of exchange

One of the major uses of Usance Bills is Drafts are used in arrangements where deferred payments are used. In such a case, the payment is made on a particular date in the future, which is determined in the future according to the letter of credit. The date of maturity, when the payment needs to be made may be at a date.

 After the person accepting the draft accepts the draft.
 At a specific pre-determined date in the future.

In some case, when there is no particular fixed date, the acceptor may refuse to accept the draft, thus extending the date of maturity.

References 

Banking in India